Carmine Tommasone (born 30 March 1984) is an Italian professional boxer. He competed in the men's lightweight event at the 2016 Summer Olympics.

Professional boxing record

References

External links
 

1984 births
Living people
Italian male boxers
Olympic boxers of Italy
Boxers at the 2016 Summer Olympics
People from Avellino
Featherweight boxers
Sportspeople from the Province of Avellino